The Htupayon Pagoda is a Buddhist stupa located in Sagaing, Myanmar. The pagoda has experienced several earthquakes since its foundation in 1444, and undergone at least three major reconstructions. The current structure was completed in 2016.

Foundation
Located near the Yadanabon Bridge in Sagaing, the Htupayon pagoda was founded by King Narapati I of Ava (r. 1442–1468) in 1444. Construction of the pagoda began on 23 October 1444, during the Chinese invasions of the kingdom (present-day Upper Myanmar). The initial phase of construction was completed about a year later in late 1445 or early 1446 when the king held a ceremony commemorating the occasion at the pagoda. The ceremony was attended by the diplomats and royals from the neighboring countries, including the Chinese officials with whom he had just signed a truce, as well as those from Lan Na, Onbaung, Hanthawaddy Pegu and (unnamed) Indian states. Work on the pagoda continued for another nine years. Its relic chamber was filled and dedicated by the king in 1447/48 (809 ME); its hti (crowning umbrella) was raised only in 1454/55 (816 ME).

Earthquakes and reconstructions
The pagoda, located on the Sagaing Fault, has experienced repeated earthquakes: in 1501/02 (863 ME), 1512/13 (874 ME), 1590/91 (952 ME), 1648/49 (1010 ME), 1781/82 (1143 ME), 1839 (1201 ME), and 2012 (1374 ME). The 11 November 2012 earthquake left the pagoda with 15 major cracks that threatened total collapse.

The pagoda has undergone at least three major reconstructions. The first was in 1605/06 (967 ME). The second reconstruction project, in response to the 1839 earthquake damages, was launched in 1851/52 (1213 ME) but was cut short as its sponsor King Pagan Min (r. 1846–1853) became ensnarled in, and lost the Second Anglo-Burmese War (1852–1853), and subsequently abdicated the throne in 1853. The pagoda was eventually was topped off with a small, disproportionate dome. The third came after the 2012 earthquake. The reconstruction committee, led by Ven. Sitagu Sayadaw, rebuilt the pagoda with a slightly enlarged form of an older (original?) profile of the pagoda, as described in an undated inscription found at the pagoda but with a wider base (additional 90 cm on each side) and a taller height (additional 10m). The small stupas that before ringed the base of the pagoda were moved to make room for the change. The pagoda's relic chamber was modeled after the Thuparamaya pagoda in Anuradhapura, Sri Lanka. The newly reconstructed pagoda was consecrated on 16 March 2016.

See also
 List of tallest structures built before the 20th century

Notes

References

Bibliography
 
 
 
 
 
 

Buildings and structures in Sagaing Region
Buddhist temples in Myanmar